The KNVB Reserve Cup is  a cup competition for the reserve teams of professional football clubs in the Netherlands. The winner qualifies for next year's KNVB Cup; if the cup winner is also the champion in the national competition for reserve teams, the cup runner-up also qualifies for the KNVB Cup.

The cup competition was established in 1997. Until then, the teams played in the KNVB District Cup competitions, and competed for the KNVB Amateur Cup. From the 1997-98 season to the 2000-01 season, the reserve teams used the number 2 to distinguish them from the club's main squad. From 2001-02 onwards, the teams use the prefix Jong (Young). In 2012 the Reserve Cup was eliminated. in 2018 the Reserve cup was reinstated.

Past winners

See also
KNVB Cup
Football in the Netherlands

KNVB Cup
Football competitions in the Netherlands
Recurring sporting events established in 1997
National association football cups